Dan Margalit (born March 13, 1938) is an Israeli journalist, author and television host.

Biography
Dan Margalit was born and raised in Tel Aviv. His father, Israel, was a doctor, and his mother, Ora, was a psychologist. He studied international relations and modern Jewish history at the Hebrew University of Jerusalem. He began writing for the Israeli newspaper Haaretz in the 1960s.

Margalit was married to Eliora Lucci Margalit, with whom he had three daughters: Keren, Shira, and Noya. Shira is the deputy director general of the Reshet television network, while Keren is a television director and screenwriter. After divorcing Eliora, Margalit married Dana, a lecturer at Ariel University.

Journalism career
In 1977, while serving as Washington correspondent of Haaretz, he revealed that Leah Rabin, wife of prime minister Yitzhak Rabin, had a United States bank account, illegal in Israel at the time. The story, known as the Dollar Account affair, led to Rabin's resignation and the nomination of Shimon Peres as the Alignment's candidate for prime minister.

In 1992 he was appointed editor of Maariv by publisher Ofer Nimrodi, but he resigned six months later. In June 2007, Margalit began to write for Israel HaYom, a new free daily newspaper in Israel.
On 6 June 2017, Margalit informed the public via his Twitter account that he had been fired from Israel Hayom.

Television career

Margalit has been one of the regular hosts of the Israeli Educational Television's current affairs show "Erev Hadash" since its early days in 1982. During the 1990s he hosted current affairs panel shows on Channel 1 and later on commercial television. Since 2004 he has hosted a current affairs panel show on Channel 10.

Sexual harassment allegations
Newspaper Haaretz reported that five female co-workers accused Dan Margalit of sexual harassment made on them, individually, during the late 1980s and early 1990s.

One of the women who accused Margalit, Hannah Kim, a former journalist for "Ha'ir" "Hadashot" (news) and "Haaretz" revealed her story on her social media account. Margalit in return to those allegations said: "There is nothing to these claims about incidents that allegedly happened more than 30 years ago. I don't intend to devote my remaining years to an argument that has no chance at this moment, given the prevailing mood."

On 18 October 2018, Orly Azoulay told that Margalit sexually harassed her after a Popolitica talk show which he hosted. As a result, Margalit announced on the same day that he would cease journalistic work.

See also
Israeli television
Israeli journalism

References

External links
 "Flowers in the gun barrel", May 21, 2004
 Unnecessary excitement on the left, June 15, 2004

1938 births
Living people
Israeli columnists
Israeli journalists
Israeli television presenters
Hebrew University of Jerusalem alumni
Maariv (newspaper) editors
Channel 1 (Israel) people